United Nations Security Council resolution 1035, adopted unanimously on 21 December 1995, after recalling Resolution 1031 (1995) and the Dayton Agreement, the Council authorised the establishment of a United Nations civilian police force, known as the International Police Task Force (IPTF) to carry out tasks in accordance with the agreement. It was part of the United Nations Mission in Bosnia and Herzegovina.

The IPTF would be established for a period of one year from the transfer of authority from the United Nations Protection Force to the multinational Implementation Force (IFOR). The Police Task Force and civilian office would be under the authority of the Secretary-General with guidance from the High Representative for Bosnia and Herzegovina. 

The Secretary-General was requested to submit reports about the work of the IPTF and civilian office every three months.

The IPTF would have an initial strength of 1,721 in accordance with the Secretary-General Boutros Boutros-Ghali's report.

References

External links
 
Text of the Resolution at undocs.org

See also 
Bosnian War
Breakup of Yugoslavia
Croatian War of Independence
List of United Nations Security Council Resolutions 1001 to 1100 (1995–1997)
Yugoslav Wars

 1035
 1035
1995 in Yugoslavia
1995 in Bosnia and Herzegovina
 1035
December 1995 events